Akoko South-East is a Local Government Area in Ondo State, Nigeria. Its headquarters are in Isua (Akoko). Akoko South-East is one of six Local Government Areas in the Northern Senatorial District of Ondo State.

Geography 
The landscape is a mix of savannah and lowland forest. Annual rainfall ranges between 8 cm-150 cm (3.14in - 59.05in) per year with an average temperature of 28-35 °C (82-95 °F). The territory is divided into Isua Oke and Isua Ile.

History 
The origins of Isua can be traced back to the ancient Benin Empire.

Demographics 
The population was 82,426 according to the 2006 census.

Governance 
In Isua, only those who come from the royal Odovia family can be crowned as king.

The king resides in Isua Oke. 

Ipe Akoko is a town in Akoko South East in Ondo State.

Economy 
It is an agricultural community. The town is situated on rocky terrain. It comprises ten quarters: Iba, Okun, Isinodo, Ilegbe, Igbede, Ugbe, Itoto, Ipaso, Uwi and Uthakpe quarters. The current king is His Royal Majesty, Oba Evangelist Francis Omokanjuola Apata, The Arogunbola II.

References

Further reading
 Chinwe I. Sanni1, Joshua Kayode2*, and Benson O. Ademiluyi (2019). Ethnobotany and Conservation of Indigenous Fruit Tree Species in Akoko Division of Ondo State, Nigeria.

Local Government Areas in Ondo State